General Hamilton may refer to:

United Kingdom
Bruce Hamilton (British Army officer) (1857–1936), British Army general
Douglas Hamilton (1818–1892), British Indian Army general
Edward Hamilton (British Army officer) (1854–1944), British Army major general
Frederick William Hamilton (1815–1890), British Army general
George Hamilton, 1st Earl of Orkney (1666–1737), British Army general
Hubert Hamilton (1861–1914), British Army major general
Ian Hamilton (British Army officer) (1853–1947), British Army general
James Hamilton, 4th Duke of Hamilton (1658–1712), Scottish lieutenant general
James Inglis Hamilton (1728–1803), British Army general
John Hamilton (Jacobite) (died 1691), Kingdom of Ireland major general
Sir John Hamilton, 1st Baronet, of Woodbrook (1755–1835), British Army lieutenant general

United States
Alexander Hamilton (c. 1755–1804), U.S. Army major general
Alexander Hamilton (general) (1815–1907), New York State Militia major general in the American Civil War
Charles Smith Hamilton (1822–1891), Union Army major general
Mark R. Hamilton (born 1945), U.S. Army major general
Pierpont M. Hamilton (1898–1982), U.S. Air Force major general
Schuyler Hamilton (1822–1903), Union Army brigadier general and nominee unconfirmed for major general
Winfield Scott Hancock (1824–1886), Union Army major general

Other
Sir George Hamilton, Comte Hamilton (died 1676), Irish-born French Army major general
Gustav David Hamilton (1699–1788), Swedish Army lieutenant general
Hugo Hamilton, Baron Hamilton (died 1724), Swedish Army general

See also
Sir John Hamilton-Dalrymple, 5th Baronet (1780–1835), British Army major general
Alexander Hamilton-Gordon (British Army officer, born 1817) (1817–1890), British Army general
Alexander Hamilton-Gordon (British Army officer, born 1859) (1859–1939), British Army lieutenant general
Attorney General Hamilton (disambiguation)